The American Corn Growers Association (ACGA) is a commodity and advocacy association founded in 1987 which represents the interests of corn (maize) producers in the United States, where corn is used for human and animal food and to produce ethanol. A rival group, the National Corn Growers Association, is seen as more closely aligned with the food processing industry.

In 2008, ACGA endorsed Barack Obama's candidacy in the United States presidential elections that year.

Related groups
Coalition for A Prosperous America
Organization for Competitive Markets
National Renewable Energy Laboratory
National Family Farm Coalition

References

External links 
  Official site

Agricultural organizations based in the United States
Organizations established in 1987
Lobbying organizations in the United States